By Request is Perry Como's Ninth RCA Victor 12" long-play album.

The title made it sound like a number of his earlier LPs, again with the implication that the song choices were made by his audience rather than himself. But where previous records like We Get Letters and Sing to Me Mr. C consisted of old standards (in contrast to the new compositions that made up his single releases), By Request was, for the most part, a collection of recent material. In several cases, Como was borrowing songs that were recent hits by his competitors: Jack Jones had just scored a hit with "Lollipops and Roses"; Como's RCA Victor labelmate Elvis Presley had done the same with "Can't Help Falling in Love", from his film Blue Hawaii; Tony Bennett was already popularizing the wistful "Once Upon a Time" from the Broadway musical All American; and Andy Williams had claimed the year's Oscar winner, "Moon River" from Breakfast at Tiffany's. The other tracks included "Maria", newly popular due to the movie version of West Side Story, Rodgers and Hammerstein's "My Favorite Things" from the 1959 musical The Sound of Music, and "The Sweetest Sounds" from Richard Rodgers' new,  show No Strings. Many critics said that the material suited Como especially well, and some even claimed that the singer had made the songs his own. By Request was Como's best-selling non-holiday LP release in three years.

Track listing

Side one

 "Maria" (music by Leonard Bernstein, lyrics by Stephen Sondheim) – 3:28
 "Lollipops and Roses" (words and music by Tony Velona) – 2:43
 "The Sweetest Sounds" (words and music by Richard Rodgers) – 2:46
 "More than Likely" (music by Jimmy Van Heusen, lyrics by Sammy Cahn) – 2:52
 "Moonglow and Theme from 'Picnic' – 3:23
 ("Moonglow", words and music by Will Hudson, Eddie DeLange, and Irving Mills)
 ("Theme from 'Picnic'", words by Steve Allen, music by George Duning)
 "My Favorite Things" (music by Richard Rodgers, lyrics by Oscar Hammerstein II) – 2:56

Side two

 "Once Upon a Time" (music by Charles Strouse, lyrics by Lee Adams) – 3:50
 "Can't Help Falling in Love" (words and music by George Weiss, Hugo Peretti, and Luigi Creatore) – 3:07
 "What's New?" (music by Bob Haggart, lyrics by Johnny Burke) – 3:04
 "Somebody Cares" (music by Johnny Robba, Frank Reardon, and Ernest G. Schweikert) – 3:18
 "I'll Remember April" (music by Gene DePaul, lyrics by Patricia Johnston and Don Raye) – 3:02
 "Moon River" (music by Henry Mancini, lyrics by Johnny Mercer) –

A recording of "The Bells of St. Mary's" was made during the sessions, but left off the completed album. It was not released until its inclusion on the 2001 compilation CD A Perry Como Christmas, which also includes "My Favorite Things" from this album.

Personnel 

 Perry Como – vocals
 Peter Gamble – liner Notes

References

External links
 Perry Como discography

Perry Como albums
1962 albums
Albums produced by Hugo & Luigi
RCA Victor albums